Euphaedra normalis is a butterfly in the family Nymphalidae. It is found in Sierra Leone.

Its wingspan ranges from 73 to 93 millimeters.

Similar species
Members of themis species group q.v.

References

External links
 

Butterflies described in 1891
normalis
Endemic fauna of Sierra Leone
Butterflies of Africa